In Japanese culture,  is a category of commercial photographic portraits of celebrities including geisha, singers, actors and actresses of both stage and film, and sports stars. The use of the term "bromide" or "promide" occurs regardless of whether bromide paper was actually used for the photograph.

In 1921 the Marubell Company began marketing photographs of celebrities under the name . The first of these was a portrait of the film actress Sumiko Kurishima. Marubell sold the photographic paper as "bromide", and its finished photographs as "Promide". The two words eventually became synonymous and between the mid-1940s and the late-1980s sales of "bromides" were used to measure the popularity of Japanese idols. Sales records were released on a monthly basis for the following categories: "Male Singers", "Female Singers", "Actors", and "Actresses". Bromides remain a popular product in the idol industry to this day.

The use of the term "bromide" to refer to a celebrity photograph remains a part of Japanese popular consciousness, and reference books such as the Kōjien Dictionary and NHK's Broadcasting Glossary recognize the term as such. "Promide" is used solely to refer to Marubell Company's bromides.

In Korea
The term is actively used in Korean culture, where it is the name of a K-pop magazine.  Based on usage of the term by, for example, sellers of K-pop goods on eBay, "bromide" denotes an oversized photo or mini-poster of a celebrity on card stock with a laminated cover or glossy finish.

References

Portrait photography
Japanese popular culture
Japanese idols